Anders Percival Almstedt (November 30, 1888 – October 29, 1937) was a Swedish sailor who competed in the 1920 Summer Olympics. He was a crew member of the Swedish boat Elsie, which won the silver medal in the 40 m² class. Almstedt committed suicide by shooting himself in his birthplace of Gothenburg in 1937.

References

External links
profile

1888 births
1937 suicides
Swedish male sailors (sport)
Sailors at the 1920 Summer Olympics – 40m2 Skerry cruiser
Olympic sailors of Sweden
Olympic silver medalists for Sweden
Olympic medalists in sailing
Medalists at the 1920 Summer Olympics
Suicides by firearm in Sweden
Sportspeople from Gothenburg